John H. Waller (born October 31, 1937) was an associate justice of the South Carolina Supreme Court. After a period of military service, he enrolled at the University of South Carolina's law school and graduated in 1963. In 1967, he was elected to the South Carolina House of Representatives and served five terms. In 1976, he was elected to the South Carolina Senate. While serving as a senator, he was elected as a trial court judge and was qualified on June 6, 1980. He was elected to the South Carolina Supreme Court on May 11, 1994, and was sworn in on June 29, 1994.

References

Justices of the South Carolina Supreme Court
People from Mullins, South Carolina
1937 births
Living people
University of South Carolina School of Law alumni
Wofford College alumni
Members of the South Carolina House of Representatives
South Carolina state senators
20th-century American politicians
20th-century American judges
21st-century American judges